Amrut may refer to:

Places
Amrut, Afghanistan, a village in Kunduz Province, Afghanistan
Amrut Nagar, a neighbourhood in the Ghatkopar suburb of Mumbai, India

Other
Amrut Distilleries, a distiller based in Bangalore, India
Amrut (whisky), a brand of single malt whisky manufactured by Amrut Distilleries
Amrut or Amrita, a Sanskrit word that literally means "immortality", and is often referred to in texts as nectar
Amrut Ghayal, the pen name of Indian poet Amrutlal Laljee Bhatt
AMRUT, a flagship scheme implemented in India